Mac. Robertson Land is the portion of Antarctica lying southward of the coast between William Scoresby Bay and Cape Darnley. In the east, Mac. Robertson Land includes the Prince Charles Mountains. It was named by the British Australian and New Zealand Antarctic Research Expedition (BANZARE) (1929–1931), under Sir Douglas Mawson, after Sir Macpherson Robertson of Melbourne, a patron of the expedition.

From 1965 onward, members of the SAE (Soviet Antarctic Expeditions) began undertaking geological fieldwork in the Prince Charles Mountains, eventually establishing a base, Soyuz Station, on the eastern shore of Beaver Lake in the northern Prince Charles Mountains.

Nomenclature
Mac.Robertson Land (no space after Mac.) is the official Australian name, but it is known in the United States as Mac. Robertson Land and in Russia as MacRobertson Land.

Features 
As well as typical Antarctic geography, Mac. Robertson Land contains significant geographical features such as Tschuffert Peak, Poulton Peak, and Peak Seven; Cape Rouse, Tilley Bay, and Frustration Dome. Two of the most important of Mac. Robertson Land's landmarks are Soyuz Station, located in the Prince Charles Mountains, and the Amery Ice Shelf.

See also 
List of mountains of Mac. Robertson Land

References

External links 

 

 
Australian Antarctic Territory
East Antarctica
Lands of Antarctica